Powhatan Wildlife Management Area is a  Wildlife Management Area (WMA) in Powhatan County, Virginia. Consisting primarily of former farmland, much of the area is currently covered by open fields; these combine with mature and new forest growth to provide habitat for a diverse array of wildlife. The property is divided by Route 60 and contains one interior parcel of privately owned land.

The area is drained by several small streams that make their way to Sallee Creek, a tributary to the James River.

Powhatan WMA is owned and maintained by the Virginia Department of Game and Inland Fisheries. The area is open to the public for hunting, trapping, fishing, hiking, boating, horseback riding, and primitive camping. Access for persons 17 years of age or older requires a valid hunting or fishing permit, a current Virginia boat registration, or a WMA access permit.

See also
 List of Virginia Wildlife Management Areas

References

External links
Virginia Department of Game and Inland Fisheries: Powhatan Wildlife Management Area

Wildlife management areas of Virginia
Protected areas of Powhatan County, Virginia